Hosenabad-e Bala (also Romanized as Ḩoşenābād-e Bālā; also known as Ḩoseynābād-e Rāḩatābād) is a village in Yazdanabad Rural District, Yazdanabad District, Zarand County, Kerman Province, Iran. At the 2006 census, its population was 61, in 15 families.

References 

Populated places in Zarand County